Finghin Ó Caiside, Gaelic-Irish physician, died 1322.

Ó Caiside was a member of a brehon family based in County Fermanagh, who became physicians to its kings. An earlier member of the family was the 12th-century poet and cleric, Gilla Mo Dutu Úa Caiside.

The Annals of the Four Masters, sub anno 1322, record Finghin's death:

 Fineen O'Cassidy, Chief Physician of Fermanagh, died.

See also

 Irish medical families

External links

 http://www.ucc.ie/celt/published/T100001C/index.html

Medieval Gaels from Ireland
People from County Fermanagh
14th-century Irish people
Medieval Irish medical doctors